Metasphenisca bezziana is a species of tephritid or fruit flies in the genus Metasphenisca of the family Tephritidae.

Distribution
Canary Islands, Eritrea, Kenya, Tanzania.

References

Tephritinae
Insects described in 1911
Diptera of Africa